The Southern 100 is a motorcycle road racing event held on the Isle of Man in July of each year. The event was first held in 1955, with three races for different classes of solo motorcycles; the 2015 calendar included twelve races for various classes. The participants compete on the Billown Circuit in the south of the island, starting and finishing at Castletown.

History 

The meeting that year had 73 entrants, with the first race held, the 350 cc event, won by Manxman Derek Ennett.

In 1958, the event was granted "National Status" and eleven years later was included in the British Championships. The races were part of the Irish Regal Championships in 1992 and 1993, and is now one of five FIM-sanctioned International meetings in the British Isles. Sidecar racing was introduced in 1962 and currently constitutes two of the twelve scheduled races.

Ian Lougher has achieved the most solo-machine victories, with 32 wins, followed closely by Joey Dunlop with 31. Dave Molyneux leads the Sidecar victories, with 15.

Sources

External links 

 
Motorsport in the Isle of Man
Motorcycle racing
Summer events in the Isle of Man